Silali may refer to:
 Mount Silali, a dormant volcano in the Great Rift Valley of Kenya
 Seləli, a village in the Qubadli Rayon of Azerbaijan